Historically Speaking was an academic journal and the official bulletin of The Historical Society in Boston, Massachusetts. It stopped publication in 2014. Prior to that it was published five times per year by the Johns Hopkins University Press.

External links 
 
 Historically Speaking at Project MUSE
 The Historical Society

Publications established in 1999
English-language journals
History journals
5 times per year journals
Magazines published in Boston